Brandon Wilson (born July 27, 1994) is an American football safety for the Cincinnati Bengals of the National Football League (NFL). He played college football at Houston.

College career 
Wilson played on both sides of the ball at Houston, at cornerback behind William Jackson III and also at running back. He also played on special teams as a kick returner. Wilson's junior season in 2015 included multiple touchdowns on offense, defense and special teams.  Brandon Wilson's college career was highlighted by his famous 110 yard touchdown return after a missed FG attempt by Oklahoma on September 3, 2016.  Officially, the return went for 100 yards, even though Wilson fielded the 53-yard missed field goal in the back of his own end zone. The Houston Cougars went on to upset the #5 ranked Oklahoma Sooners in the week one upset.

Professional career
Wilson was drafted by the Cincinnati Bengals in the sixth round, 207th overall, in the 2017 NFL Draft. He was one of three Houston Cougars to be selected that year. He was only the fourth player ever selected by the Bengals organization after a trade up in the draft. The team elected to play Wilson at safety rather than the cornerback position he played in college.

He injured his knee during rookie minicap, and was placed on the non-football injury list in late July. Wilson was waived on September 2, 2017 and was signed to the practice squad the next day. He was promoted to the active roster on November 11, 2017.

On October 13, 2019, in a Week 6 loss to the Baltimore Ravens, Wilson returned a kickoff ninety-two yards for his first career touchdown. He also added four tackles and a forced fumble in the game. He was placed on injured reserve on December 6, 2019 with a hand injury.

Wilson re-signed on a one-year contract with the Bengals on April 26, 2020. On November 29, 2020, Wilson returned a kickoff by the New York Giants for a 103-yard touchdown. It was the longest touchdown return in franchise history.

Wilson signed a two-year contract extension with the Bengals on March 16, 2021.

On November 9, 2021, Wilson was placed on injured reserve after suffering a torn ACL in Week 9.

On August 23, 2022, Wilson was placed on the reserve/physically unable to perform list.

References

External links
Cincinnati Bengals bio
Houston Cougars bio

1994 births
Living people
American football cornerbacks
American football running backs
American football return specialists
Houston Cougars football players
Cincinnati Bengals players
Players of American football from Shreveport, Louisiana